Roxburgh and Berwickshire was a constituency of the Scottish Parliament until 2011. It elected one Member of the Scottish Parliament (MSP) by the plurality (first past the post) method of election. Also, however, it was one of nine constituencies in the South of Scotland electoral region, which elects seven additional members, in addition to nine constituency MSPs, to produce a form of proportional representation for the region as a whole.

Electoral region 

The other eight constituencies of the South of Scotland region were: Ayr, Carrick, Cumnock and Doon Valley, Clydesdale, Cunninghame South, Dumfries, East Lothian, Galloway and Upper Nithsdale and Tweeddale, Ettrick and Lauderdale.

The region covered the Dumfries and Galloway council area, the Scottish Borders council area, the South Ayrshire council area, part of the East Ayrshire council area, part of the East Lothian council area, part of the Midlothian council area, part of the North Ayrshire council area and part of the South Lanarkshire council area.

Constituency boundaries and council area 

The Roxburgh and Berwickshire constituency was created at the same time as the Scottish Parliament, in 1999, with the name and boundaries of an  existing Westminster constituency. In 2005, however, Scottish Westminster constituencies were mostly replaced with new constituencies.

The Holyrood constituency covered an eastern portion of the Scottish Borders council area. The rest of the council area was covered by the Tweeddale, Ettrick and Lauderdale constituency, which also covered a western portion of the Midlothian council area.

Boundary review 

Following its First Periodic review of constituencies to the Scottish Parliament, the Boundary Commission for Scotland recommended that the Roxburgh and Berwickshire seat be expanded to form the newly shaped Ettrick, Roxburgh and Berwickshire constituency in time for the 2011 election.

Member of the Scottish Parliament

Election results

References 

Politics of the Scottish Borders
Scottish Parliament constituencies and regions 1999–2011
1999 establishments in Scotland
Constituencies established in 1999
2011 disestablishments in Scotland
Constituencies disestablished in 2011
Eyemouth
Kelso, Scottish Borders
Jedburgh
Hawick
Coldstream
Duns, Scottish Borders